The 1922 Baylor Bears football team was an American football team that represented Baylor University as a member of the Southwest Conference (SWC) during the 1922 college football season. In its second season under head coach Frank Bridges, the team compiled an 8–3 record (5–0 against SWC opponents), won the conference championship, and outscored opponents by a total of 295 to 128.

Schedule

References

Baylor
Baylor Bears football seasons
Southwest Conference football champion seasons
Baylor Bears football